The 600-ship Navy was a strategic plan of the United States Navy during the 1980s to rebuild its fleet after cutbacks that followed the end of the Vietnam War. The plan, which originated with Republican leaders, was an important campaign plank of Ronald Reagan in the 1980 presidential election, who advocated a larger military and strategic confrontation with the Soviet Union.

The number of ships peaked at 594 in 1987, before declining sharply after the end of the Cold War in 1989–1991.

The program included:
 Recommissioning the s
 Keeping older ships in service longer
 A large new construction program
 Stepped up production of s

The idea was supported by John F. Lehman, who became Reagan's Secretary of the Navy, and Caspar Weinberger, Reagan's Secretary of Defense.

Background
The idea behind the 600-ship Navy can be traced back to the Vietnam War.  During the war, the armed services rapidly expanded to meet the demands placed on them.

The Soviet Union, which had been supporting North Vietnam, began staging their naval vessels from former US ports in South Vietnam. Building on this gain, Soviet vessels began to sail in all seven seas with increased vigor and even ventured into the Gulf of Mexico. Soviet forces also stepped up infantry, armor and air force deployments in Eastern Europe.

Reagan plan
It was against this backdrop in 1980 that the United States began an election year. Ronald Reagan continued this in 1984, releasing a campaign commercial "Bear," which played on the use of the bear as a national symbol of Russia in order to promote higher vigilance and defense expenditures against the Soviet Union.

The overseas strategic retaliation arm was strengthened and the development of new weaponry like the B-1B bomber, the Bradley fighting vehicle, and the Abrams tank was completed and they were put into production.

Lehman attempted to "front-load" the program, by committing the Navy to the building program, but in the end the funds were not available and it fell short.

Ships and weapons systems deployed during the plan
The Navy saw the largest benefit of the rebuilding.  Under the Reagan Administration, the first of the  ballistic missile submarines were completed. This class was the largest submarine ever built in the US. The ship carried 24 Trident I nuclear-capable missiles, each one with a  range.  Construction of the Nimitz class of supercarriers and  attack submarines was dramatically stepped up.  The revolutionary new Aegis combat system was installed on the upcoming  ships, production of which was also stepped up. Several aircraft carriers were put through Service Life Extension Programs (SLEPs) aimed at keeping them in service longer. The Iowa-class battleships, built in the 1940s, were all recommissioned and refitted with RGM-84 Harpoon, BGM-109 Tomahawk, and Phalanx CIWS system capabilities, plus their armor plating would be more resilient against anti-ship missiles. The first Harpoons, Tomahawks, and AGM-88 HARM missiles all debuted on the navy's ships.  Naval aviation was stepped up with the introduction of the F/A-18 Hornet, along with improved versions of the EA-6 Prowler electronic countermeasure aircraft, the A-6 Intruder, and the F-14 Tomcat. In addition, the nation's strategic retaliatory arm was strengthened with advanced B-1B bombers and deploying Pershing II theater missiles to Europe. The initiative also included deployment of Abrams main battle tanks and Bradley armored fighting vehicles.

Build-up by year
Aircraft carriers

Battleships

Cruisers

Destroyers

Frigates

Amphibious assault ship

Dock landing ship

Amphibious transport dock

Amphibious cargo ship

Tank landing ship

Command Ship

Hospital ship

Minesweeper

Patrol ships

Replenishment oiler

Tanker

Ammunition ship

Combat stores ship

Fast combat support ships

Roll-on/roll-off

Destroyer tender

Submarine tender

Crane ship

Heavy-lift ship

Cable ship

Rescue and salvage ship

Tracking ship

Ocean surveillance ship

Oceanographic research ship

Attack Submarines

Ballistic missile submarines

End of the plan
Eventually political pressure to reduce the national budget deficit resulted in Congress reversing itself and passing a series of declining defense budgets beginning in 1986.  Weinberger clashed with Congress over the cuts, resigning in late 1987, and was succeeded by Frank Carlucci. Furthermore, concerns were raised about how the expansion of the Navy would reduce attention and resources needed in other scenarios where the Soviets also had to be confronted such as Europe.

Lehman's successor as Navy Secretary, Jim Webb, remained a fierce proponent of the expanded fleet, and disagreed with Carlucci over how to cut the Navy budget in line with other services. Webb resigned rather than endorse Carlucci's cut of 16 frigates.  As revealed in The Reagan Diaries, Reagan reflected about Webb's resignation on 22 February 1988: "Present Sec. Webb resigned over budget cuts. I don't think Navy was sorry to see him go."

Following the dissolution of the Soviet Union in the early 1990s and the lack of a perceived threat against the United States, several of the Reagan Administration's policies and plans, such as the "600-ship Navy", were scaled back or abandoned. US bases across Europe and North America were slowly decommissioned and closed, others were mothballed through the Base Realignment and Closure (BRAC) process.  In the Navy, this resulted in the retirement of several older carriers, the decommissioning of all four of the Iowa-class battleships and the cancellation of the remaining s.

See also
 Cold War (1979–1985)
 Cold War (1985–1991)
 List of ships of the United States Navy
 National Defense Reserve Fleet
 United States Navy ships

References

Further reading
 NSC-NSDD-32:  U.S. National Security Strategy – The White House, May 20, 1982. archive listings
 Congressional Budget Office:
 Building a 600-Ship Navy: Costs, Timing, and Alternative Approaches. March 1982
 Manpower for a 600-Ship Navy: Costs and Policy Alternatives. August 1983
 GlobalSecurity.org
 Ship Building 1981–89. Reagan, Ronald
 Naval Historical Center:
 The U.S. Navy in the Cold War Era, 1945–1991
 NWP 1 – Strategic Concepts of the Navy. February 1987
 Naval War College:
 John B. Hattendorf. "The Evolution of the U.S. Navy's Maritime Strategy, 1977–1986" Naval War College Newport Paper 19 (2004), . Available in PDF format here and here
 United States Naval Institute:
 Lieutenant General Bernard E. Trainor, U.S. Marine Corps (Retired). "Triumph in Strategic Thinking". United States Naval Institute Proceedings Vol. 134, No. 2 (February 2008) pp. 40–42
 Norman Friedman. "The Navy, the Cold War – and Now" United States Naval Institute Proceedings Vol. 133, No. 10 (October 2007) pp. 58–62

External links
 U.S. Naval Strategy During the Cold War from the Dean Peter Krogh Foreign Affairs Digital Archives
 Building a 600 Ship Navy: The Congressional Budget Office Report

N
United States Navy in the 20th century